Natasha Perdew Silas (born 1965) is a staff attorney at the Federal Defender Program for the Northern District of Georgia based in Atlanta. She was also the nominee to a seat on the United States District Court for the Northern District of Georgia. Her nomination was returned to the President on December 17, 2011, pursuant to the rules of the Senate.

Early life and education
Natasha Silas was born in 1965 in Atlanta, Georgia to Amanda Bowens Perdew and John Perdew. Mrs. Silas went to Frederick Douglass High School and graduated in 1983 as Valedictorian. Silas received a B.S. degree from Massachusetts Institute of Technology in 1988 and a law degree from University of Virginia School of Law in 1992, where she met her then-future and current husband, Kendal Silas.

Career
Between 1992 and 1994, Silas worked as a litigation associate at the law firm of Sutherland Asbill & Brennan in Atlanta. Since 1994 she has worked as federal public defender in the Northern District of Georgia.

Northern District of Georgia nomination
Silas was first nominated to fill the seat of Judge Clarence Cooper  by President Barack Obama on January 26, 2011. She never received a vote and subsequently her nomination expired when it was returned to the President on December 17, 2011.

See also
 Barack Obama judicial appointment controversies

References

Living people
Massachusetts Institute of Technology alumni
University of Virginia School of Law alumni
1965 births
Public defenders